is a former Japanese football player.

Playing career
Nagatomo was born in Miyazaki Prefecture on December 7, 1982. After graduating from high school, he joined J1 League club Avispa Fukuoka in 2001. However he could not play at all in the match and Avispa was relegated to J2 League end of 2001 season. On April 27, 2002, he debuted as substitute defender against Ventforet Kofu. On May 6, he played as substitute midfielder against Omiya Ardija. However he could only play these 2 matches. In 2003, he moved to Regional Leagues club Shizuoka FC. He played for the club until 2006.

Club statistics

References

External links

1982 births
Living people
Association football people from Miyazaki Prefecture
Japanese footballers
J1 League players
J2 League players
Avispa Fukuoka players
Association football midfielders